Ingatun-Lukman "Tong" Gumuntul Istarul (LKS-KAM) is a Filipino politician and current mayor of Tipo-Tipo in Basilan (2010–13).

References

Lakas–CMD politicians
Mayors of places in Basilan
Living people
Filipino Muslims
Year of birth missing (living people)